Surgeon General  was a Japanese microbiologist and army medical officer who served as the director of Unit 731, a biological warfare unit of the Imperial Japanese Army.

Ishii led the development and application of biological weapons at Unit 731 in Manchukuo during the Second Sino-Japanese War from 1937 to 1945, including the bubonic plague attacks at Chinese cities of Changde and Ningbo, and planned the Operation Cherry Blossoms at Night biological attack against the United States. Ishii and his colleagues also engaged in human experimentation, resulting in the deaths of over 10,000 people, most of them civilians or prisoners of war. Ishii was later granted immunity in the International Military Tribunal for the Far East by the United States government in exchange for information and research for the U.S. biological warfare program.

Biography

Early years
Shirō Ishii was born in Shibayama in Chiba Prefecture, Japan, the fourth son of Katsuya Ishii, a wealthy landowner and sake maker. The Ishii family was the community's largest landholder and exercised a feudal dominance over the local village and surrounding hamlets. Ishii attended the Chiba Imperial School in Chiba City and the Fourth High School in Kanazawa, Ishikawa Prefecture. He was a "teacher's favorite" and was said to have a photographic memory, able to recite a difficult text from cover to cover in one reading. Some of his classmates regarded him as brash, abrasive and arrogant. His daughter Harumi, along with former members of Unit 731 felt that Shiro had been "unjustly condemned" saying "my father was a very warm-hearted person...he was so bright that people sometimes could not catch up with the speed of his thinking and that made him irritated, and he shouted at them." In 1916, Ishii enrolled at the Kyoto Imperial University to study medicine. He graduated in 1920, and married the daughter of Akari Torasaburō, the university's president, in the same year.

In 1921, Ishii was commissioned into the Imperial Japanese Army as a military surgeon with the rank of Army Surgeon, First Class (surgeon lieutenant). In 1922, Ishii was assigned to the 1st Army Hospital and Army Medical School in Tokyo, where his work impressed his superiors enough to enable him to return to Kyoto Imperial University to pursue post-graduate medical schooling in 1924. During his studies, Ishii would often grow bacteria "pets" in multiple petri dishes, and his odd practice of raising bacteria as companions rather than as research subjects made him notable to the staff of the university. He did not get along well with his classmates; they would become infuriated as a result of his "pushy behaviour" and "indifference". One of his mentors, Professor Ren Kimura, recalled that Ishii had an odd habit of doing his laboratory work in the middle of the night, using laboratory equipment that had been carefully cleaned by his classmates earlier. His classmates would "really be mad when they came in and found the laboratory equipment dirty the next morning".
In 1925, Ishii was promoted to Army Surgeon, Second Class (surgeon captain).

Biological warfare project
By 1927, Ishii was advocating for the creation of a Japanese bio-weapons program, and in 1928 began a two-year tour of the West where he did extensive research on the effects of biological warfare and chemical warfare developments from World War I onwards. Ishii's travels were highly successful and helped win him the patronage of Sadao Araki, the Japanese Minister of the Army. Ishii also received the backing of Araki's ideological rival in the army, Major-General Tetsuzan Nagata, who was later considered Ishii's "most active supporter" at the Khabarovsk War Crime Trials. In January 1931, Ishii received promotion to Senior Army Surgeon, Third Class (surgeon major). According to Ishii's followers, Ishii was extremely loyal to the Emperor and had an "enthusiastic personality" and "daring and carefree attitude", with eccentric work habits such as working late at night in the lab after hanging out with friends at town. He was also known for his heavy drinking, womanizing and embezzling habits, which were tolerated by his colleagues. Ishii was described as a vehement nationalist, and this helped him gain access to the people who could provide him funds.

In 1935, Ishii was promoted to Senior Army Surgeon, Second Class (surgeon lieutenant-colonel). On August 1, 1936, Ishii would be given formal control over Unit 731 and its research facilities. In these facilities Ishii and his men would perform experiments on live humans, including but not limited to: infecting living subjects with plague rats, forced pregnancies, vivisections (often conducted without anesthesia), and inducing frostbite and trying to cure it.

A former member of Unit 731 recalled in 1998 that when he first met Ishii in Tokyo, he was surprised at his commander's appearance: "Ishii was slovenly dressed. His uniform was covered with food stains and ashes from numerous cigarettes. His officer's sword was poorly fastened and dragged on the floor". However, in Manchuria, Ishii would transform into a different character: "he was dressed immaculately. His uniform was spotless, and his sword was tied correctly".

Further promotions for Ishii would follow; he was promoted to Senior Army Surgeon, First Class (surgeon colonel) in 1938, Assistant Surgeon General (surgeon Major General) in March 1941, and Surgeon General (surgeon Lieutenant General) in March 1945. Towards the end of the war Ishii would develop a plan to spread plague fleas along the populated west coast of the US, known as Operation Cherry Blossoms at Night. This plan was not realized due to the surrender of Japan on August 15, 1945. Ishii and the Japanese government attempted to cover up the facilities and experiments, but ultimately failed with their secret university lab in Tokyo and their main lab in Harbin, China. The Japanese Army's Unit 731 War Crimes Exhibition Hall (731罪证陈列馆)[ex] in Harbin stands to this day as a museum to the unit and the atrocities they committed.

War crime immunity
Ishii was arrested by United States authorities during the Occupation of Japan at the end of World War II and, along with other leaders, was supposed to be thoroughly interrogated by Soviet authorities. Instead, Ishii and his team managed to negotiate and receive immunity in 1946 from Japanese war-crimes prosecution before the Tokyo tribunal in exchange for their full disclosure. Although the Soviet authorities wished the prosecutions to take place, the United States objected after the reports of the investigating US microbiologists. Among these was Edwin Hill, the Chief of Fort Detrick, whose report stated that the information was "absolutely invaluable;" it "could never have been obtained in the United States because of scruples attached to experiments on humans" and "the information was obtained fairly cheaply." On May 6, 1947, Douglas MacArthur wrote to Washington, D.C., that "additional data, possibly some statements from Ishii probably can be obtained by informing Japanese involved that information will be retained in intelligence channels and will not be employed as 'War Crimes' evidence."

Ishii's immunity deal was concluded in 1948 and he was never prosecuted for any war crimes, and his exact whereabouts or occupation were unknown from 1947. Richard Drayton, a Cambridge University history lecturer, claimed that Ishii later went to Maryland to advise on bioweapons. Another source says he stayed in Japan, where he opened a clinic, performing examinations and treatments for free. Ishii kept a diary, but it did not make reference to any of his wartime activities with Unit 731.

Death

In his last years, Ishii could not speak clearly; he was uncomfortable and on pain medication and spoke in a harsh voice. He died on October 9, 1959 from laryngeal cancer at the age of 67 at a hospital in Shinjuku, Tokyo. Interestingly, one of Ishii's idols, Admiral Tōgō Heihachirō, also died from throat cancer. Ishii's funeral was chaired by Masaji Kitano, his second-in-command at Unit 731.

According to his daughter, Ishii converted to Catholicism shortly before his death.
 
Ishii's daughter, Harumi Ishii, recalled in an interview that shortly before his death, Ishii's medical condition worsened:

Popular culture
 Portrayed by Min Ji-hwan in the MBC TV series Eyes of Dawn
 Portrayed by Gang Wang in the 1988 film Men Behind The Sun

See also
 Josef Mengele
 Operation Paperclip
 Khabarovsk War Crime Trials

Sources

Citations

References

 Barenblatt, Daniel. A Plague Upon Humanity: the Secret Genocide of Axis Japan's Germ Warfare Operation, HarperCollins, 2004. 
 Gold, Hal. Unit 731 Testimony, Charles E Tuttle Co., 1996. 
 Williams, Peter and Wallace, David. Unit 731: Japan's Secret Biological Warfare in World War II, Free Press, 1989. 
 Harris, Sheldon H. Factories of Death: Japanese Biological Warfare 1932–45 and the American Cover-Up, Routledge, 1994. 
 Endicott, Stephen and Hagerman, Edward. The United States and Biological Warfare: Secrets from the Early Cold War and Korea, Indiana University Press, 1999. 
 Handelman, Stephen and Alibek, Ken. Biohazard: The Chilling True Story of the Largest Covert Biological Weapons Program in the World – Told from Inside by the Man Who Ran It, Random House, 1999. 
 Harris, Robert and Paxman, Jeremy. A Higher Form of Killing: The Secret History of Chemical and Biological Warfare, Random House, 2002. 
 Barnaby, Wendy. The Plague Makers: The Secret World of Biological Warfare, Frog Ltd, 1999. 
 Yang Yan-Jun and Tam Yue-Him. Unit 731: Laboratory of the Devil, Auschwitz of the East: Japanese Biological Warfare in China 1933-45. Fonthill Media, 2018. 

1892 births
1959 deaths
Japanese military doctors
Japanese Christians
Japanese human subject research
Japanese generals
Japanese military personnel of World War II
Japanese biological weapons program
Japanese Roman Catholics
Military personnel from Chiba Prefecture
Converts to Christianity
Kyoto University alumni
Deaths from esophageal cancer
Deaths from cancer in Japan